The Royal Brewster House is a historic house on Brewster Lane in the Buxton Lower Corner village of Buxton, Maine, United States.  Built in 1805, it is an imposing Federal style house in a relatively rural setting.  It was built for Dr. Royal Brewster, the town physician for about 40 years, and was the home for many years of Brewster's brother John, a well-known deaf-mute itinerant painter of folk portraiture.  The house was listed on the National Register of Historic Places in 1975.

Description and history
The Brewster House is set on the north side of Brewster Lane, a short road that forms a triangular island with Maine State Route 112 and United States Route 202.  It is a two-story wood-frame structure, five bays wide, with a low-pitch hip roof, clapboard siding, and a granite foundation.  The main facade has a center entry, which is flanked by sidelight windows and topped by a recessed arch.  This is sheltered by a Greek Revival portico, with square columns at the front and pilasters at the rear.  The cornice features fine Federal style decorative carving.  To the rear of the house a two-story ell extends, joining the main house to a carriage house and barn.  The house interior features restrained Federal period woodwork throughout, and a parlor decorated with French wallpaper in 1859.

The house was built in 1805 by Joseph Woodman, a prominent local builder and businessman.  It was built for Dr. Royal Brewster, who had married a Buxton native in 1795 and settled there.  Brewster served as the town doctor for about forty years, and provided space in the home for his brother John.  John was born a deaf-mute, and was educated despite the handicap, and made a career for himself as an itinerant painter of portraits.  He traveled widely practicing his art, and his work is highly regarded.

See also
National Register of Historic Places listings in York County, Maine

References

Houses on the National Register of Historic Places in Maine
Federal architecture in Maine
Houses in York County, Maine
1805 establishments in Massachusetts
National Register of Historic Places in York County, Maine
Houses completed in 1805